Nekhen, also known as Hierakonpolis (either: City of the Hawk, or City of the Falcon, a reference to Horus) was the religious and political capital of Upper Egypt at the end of prehistoric Egypt ( 3200–3100 BC) and probably also during the Early Dynastic Period ( 3100–2686 BC).

The oldest known tomb with painted decoration, a mural on its plaster walls, is located in Nekhen and is thought to date to c. 3500–3200 BC. It shares distinctive imagery with artifacts from the Gerzeh culture.

Horus cult center
 
Nekhen was the center of the cult of a hawk deity, Horus of Nekhen, which raised one of the most ancient Egyptian temples in this city. It retained its importance as the cultic center for this divine patron of the kings long after the site had otherwise declined.

The first settlement at Nekhen dates from either the predynastic Amratian culture (c. 4400 BC) or, perhaps, during the late Badari culture (c. 5000 BC). At its height, from c. 3400 BC, Nekhen had at least 5,000 and possibly, as many as 10,000 inhabitants. Most of Upper Egypt then became unified under rulers from Abydos during the Naqada III period (3200–3000 BCE), at the expense of rival cities, especially Nekhen (Hierakonpolis). The conflicts leading to the supremacy of Abydos may appear on numerous reliefs of the Naqada II period, such as the Gebel el-Arak Knife, or the frieze of Tomb 100 at Nekhen (Hierakonpolis).

The ruins of the city originally were excavated toward the end of the nineteenth century by the English archaeologists James Quibell and Frederick W. Green.

Quibell and Green discovered the "Main Deposit", a foundation deposit beneath the temple, in 1894. Quibell originally was trained under Flinders Petrie, the father of modern Egyptology, however, he failed to follow Petrie's methods. The temple was a difficult site to excavate to begin with, so his excavation was poorly conducted and then, poorly documented. Specifically, the situational context of the items therein is poorly recorded and often, the reports of Quibell and Green are in contradiction.

The most famous artifact commonly associated with the main deposit, the Narmer Palette, now is thought probably not to have been in the main deposit at all. Quibell's report made in 1900 put the palette in the deposit, but Green's report in 1902 put it about one to two yards away. Green's version is substantiated by earlier field notes (Quibell kept none), so it is now the accepted record of events.

The main deposit dates to the early Old Kingdom, but the artistic style of the objects in the deposit indicate that they were from Naqada III and were moved into the deposit at a later date. The other important item in the deposit clearly dates to the late prehistoric. This object, the Scorpion Macehead, depicts a king known only by the ideogram for scorpion, now called Scorpion II, participating in what seems to be a ritual irrigation ceremony. Although the Narmer Palette is more famous because it shows the first king to wear both the crowns of Upper and Lower Egypt, the Scorpion Macehead indicates some early military hostility with the north by showing dead lapwings, the symbol of Lower Egypt, hung from standards.

John Garstang excavated at Nekhen in 1905–06. He initially hoped to excavate the town site, but encountered difficulties working there, and soon turned his attention to the area he misidentified as a 'fort' instead. That site dates to the second dynasty King Khasekhemwy. Beneath that area, Garstang excavated a Predynastic cemetery consisting of 188 graves, which served the bulk of the city population during the late Predynastic and Early Dynastic periods, revealing the burial practices of the non-elite Egyptians living at Nekhen.

More recently, the concession was excavated further by a multinational team of archaeologists, Egyptologists, geologists, and members of other sciences, which was coordinated by Michael Hoffman until his death in 1990, then by Barbara Adams of University College London and Dr. Renee Friedman representing the University of California, Berkeley and the British Museum, until Barbara Adams's death in 2001, and by Renée Friedman thereafter.

Possible ritual structures
The structure at Nekhen known by the misnomer "fort" is a massive mud-brick enclosure built by King Khasekhemwy of the Second Dynasty. It appears to be similar in structure and ritual purpose as the similarly misidentified 'forts' constructed at Abydos, all without apparent military function. The true function of these structures is unknown, but they seem to be related to the rituals of kingship and the culture. Religion was interwoven inexorably with kingship in Ancient Egypt.

The ritual structure at Nekhen was built on a prehistoric cemetery. The excavations there, as well as the work of later brick robbers, have seriously undermined the walls and led to the near collapse of the structure. For two years, during 2005 and 2006, the team led by Friedman attempted to stabilize the existing structure and support the endangered areas of the structure with new mudbricks.

Excavations at Hierakonpolis (Upper Egypt) in 1998 found archaeological evidence of ritual masks similar to those used in locations further south of Egypt and significant amounts of obsidian which were linked to Ethiopian quarry sites.

Oldest known Egyptian painted tomb

Other discoveries at Nekhen include Tomb 100, the oldest known tomb with a mural painted on its plaster walls. The sepulchre is thought to date to the Gerzeh culture (c. 3500–3200 BC).

It is presumed that the mural shows religious scenes and images. It includes figures featured in Egyptian culture for three thousand years—a funerary procession of barques, presumably a goddess standing between two upright lionesses, a wheel of various horned quadrupeds, several examples of a staff that became associated with the deity of the earliest cattle culture and one being held up by a heavy-breasted goddess. Animals depicted include onagers or zebras, ibexes, ostriches, lionesses, impalas, gazelles, and cattle.

Several interpretations of the themes and designs visible in the Nekhen fresco have been associated with a distinctly foreign artifact found in Egypt, the Gebel el-Arak Knife (c. 3500–3200 BCE), with a Mesopotamian scene described as the Master of animals, showing a presumed figure between two lions, presumed fighting scenes, or the boats.

Oldest known zoo
 
The oldest known zoological collection was revealed during excavations at Nekhen in 2009 of a menagerie that dates to c. 3500 BC. The animals, numbering in totality fourteen during May 2015, include a leopard, two crocodiles, hippopotami, hartebeest, two  elephants, baboons, and African wildcats. Animals discovered at the cemetery site were found to have had broken bones.

Continuous activity 
There are later tombs at Nekhen, dating to the Middle Kingdom, Second Intermediate Period, and New Kingdom. In the painted tomb of Horemkhauef a biographical inscription reporting a journey to the capital by him was found. He lived during the Second Intermediate Period. 
Because it had a strong association with Egyptian religious ideas about kingship, the temple of Horus at Nekhen was used as late as the Ptolemaic Kingdom, persisting as a religious center throughout the thousands of years of Ancient Egyptian culture.

Artifacts

Cylinder seals
Cylinders seals at Nekhen include some of the first known scenes of an ancient Egyptian king smiting captive enemies with a mace. Cylinder seals are generally thought to have been derived from Mesopotamian examples, in an instance of Egypt-Mesopotamia relations.

Cosmetic palettes
Several of the finest pre-Dynastic decorated palettes were discovered in Nekhen. They display Mesopotamia-inspired animals such as the serpopards, and also incorporate some of the first hieroglyphs.

Maceheads

Notes

References

External links
 Interactive Dig: Hierakonpolis
 Hierakonpolis Online
 Leopards, hippos, and cats, oh my! The World's First Zoo by Lorraine Boissoneault, November 12, 2015
 A complete narrative of the events portrayed on the mural of Tomb 100 in Hierakonpolis (Nekhen)

Populated places established in the 5th millennium BC
Archaeological sites in Egypt
Cities in ancient Egypt
Former populated places in Egypt
Horus
Amratian culture
Badarian culture